Derrick Graham may refer to:

 Derrick Graham (American football) (born 1967), American football offensive tackle
 Derrick Graham (politician), American politician in the Kentucky House of Representatives